Alucita panduris is a moth of the family Alucitidae. It is found in southern India.

References

Moths described in 1911
Alucitidae
Moths of Asia
Taxa named by Edward Meyrick